Beg may refer to:
 Begging
 Baig, an ancient Turkic administrative title (chieftain, governor etc.)
 Beg (title), a Turkic administrative title (Bey)
 Begzada (name style), son of Beg
 Beg Khan, a combination of Beg and Khan titles
 "Beg", a song from Evans Blue's debut album, The Melody and the Energetic Nature of Volume
 "Beg", a song from All Saints album, ''All Saints
 "Beg", a song from M.I's album, The Chairman
 "Beg", a song by Jack & Jack, 2017
 Beg (1970 film), a Soviet film
 Beg (2011 film), a 2010 film starring Tony Todd
 Beg Ferati (born 1986), Swiss footballer
 Beg (dinosaur), a ceratopsian dinosaur

See also
BEG (disambiguation) 
 Begg